The Rise of the Creative Class is a 2002 non-fiction book that was written by noted American sociologist and economist Richard Florida.
Updated in 2019 with a new preface, the book is one of a series for general audiences by Florida about the connection between place and economy.

See also 
 The Cultural Creatives

References

American non-fiction books
Books about urbanism
2002 non-fiction books